Gråsten is a town with a population of 4,274 (1 January 2022) on the east coast of the Jutland peninsula in south Denmark by the Nybøl Nor at an inlet of the Flensburg Fjord. It belongs to the Sønderborg municipality in Region of Southern Denmark. The town is located almost exactly at the center of a triangle defined by the towns of Aabenraa, Flensburg and Sønderborg Castle (Sønderborg Slot). 

The Egernsund Bridge, which crosses the Egern Strait, connects Gråsten with the town of Egernsund.

The Gravenstein apple originates from the city.

Gråsten municipality
Until 1 January 2007 Gråsten was the seat of the former Gråsten municipality (Danish, kommune) in South Jutland County, covering an area of 57 km2, and with a total population of 7,256 (2005). Its last mayor was Bendt Olesen, a member of the Social Democrats (Socialdemokraterne) political party.

Gråsten municipality ceased to exist due to Kommunalreformen ("The Municipality Reform" of 2007).  It was combined with Augustenborg, Broager, Nordborg, Sundeved, Sydals, and Sønderborg municipalities to form the new Sønderborg municipality.  This created a municipality with an area of 499 km2 and a total population of 49,886 (2005).

Famous residents of Gråsten
The Danish Royal Family has their summer residence, Gråsten Palace, in the town

Other notable people 
 Andreas Hohwü (1803 in Gråsten – 1885) a Danish clockmaker active in Amsterdam

External links
 The new Sønderborg municipality's official website  
 Gråsten Palace

References

 Municipal statistics: NetBorger Kommunefakta, delivered from KMD aka Kommunedata (Municipal Data)
 Municipal mergers and neighbors: Eniro new municipalities map

Cities and towns in the Region of Southern Denmark
Former municipalities of Denmark
Sønderborg Municipality